The Nacionalna Liga Srbije (NLS) (Serbian National League)  was a league of American football in Serbia.

League history

League 2004 

The national league was founded 26 October 2003. First league game in Serbia was played in 2004 and 5 teams competed that year. Those teams were: Belgrade Vukovi, Kragujevac Wild Boars, Niš Steeds, Pančevo Panthers and Sirmium Legionaries. This league was played without necessary equipment, pads and helmets. 

Final game was played on November, 7th, 2004. in Kragujevac on Čika Dača football field, where home team Kragujevac Wild Boars defeated Belgrade Vukovi 21-6.

National Cup 2005 

Instead of a league in 2005, there was a cup held in Serbia. It was the first, and for now the only official cup played in this country. Ten teams took part in this competition. Those teams were: Belgrade Vukovi, Kragujevac Wild Boars, Sirmium Legionaries, Novi Sad Dukes, Kraljevo Royal Crowns, Pančevo Panthers, Belgrade Blue Dragons, Niš Steeds, Požarevac Outlaws, Čačak Mad Dogs.

Final game was played in Belgrade on FK Obilić field on Jun, 19th 2005. and this time Vukovi defeated Wild Boars, 20-7.

This cup was also played without pads and helmets.

League 2006 

Four teams got football equipment in 2006, and started South-Eastern League of American football, aka CEFL. Those teams were Vukovi, Wild Boars, Legionaries and Dukes.

But, unofficial league without pad and helmets was also played in Serbia. The popularity of American football was rapidly increasing in Serbia by this time. 11 Team took part in this league, they were divided into two divisions North and South.

North:
1. Klek Knights
2. Pančevo Panthers
3. Sombor Celtis
4. Šabac Sharks
5. Kula Hunters

South:
1. Kraljevo Royal Crowns
2. Požarevac Outlaws
3. Električar
4. Smederevo Bedemi
5. Obrenovac Nebeski Gromovi
6. Jagodina Strawberry Celts

Klek Knights defeated Kraljevo Royal Crowns 16-7, in the final game that was played in Vršac on October 15, 2006.

National League 2007 

After one year when teams from CEFL did not play domestic league, in 2007 every team took part. From 2007 there was a domestic competition with equipment. There was three competitions this year:

National Competition 07 which was made from teams that played domestic league in 2006, and new teams. It was played with equipment, and teams were divided in two divisions:

Division A:
Belgrade Blue Dragons
Sirmium Legionaries
Klek Knights
Pančevo Panthers

Division B:
Vrbas Hunters
Belgrade Vukovi 
Vršac
Požarevac Outlaws
Obrenovac Sky Thunders

The final game was played on October 7, in Inđija where Klek Knights defeated Belgrade Blue Dragons, 21-14.  These two teams played against two best CEFL teams in National Championship for the domestic title in 2007.

National Championship 07 

There were three games played in National Championship, and two teams from National Competition played against two CEFL teams.

Semi-Final:
Klek Knights - Novi Sad Dukes 10:17
Vukovi Beograd - Beograd Blue Dragons 27:21

Final
Vukovi Beograd - Novi Sad Dukes 25:15
This game was played in Belgrade on November, 4th 2007.

SAFS League

This was the third league in Serbia in 2007. This was the league without necessary equipment. Seven teams made it, and they were divided into two divisions:

North
Šabac Sharks 
Inđija Indians
Smederevo Bedemi

South
Čačak Angel Warriors
Niš Imperatori
Mladenovac Forestlanders
Jagodina Ćurani

Final game was played in Klek on September 29, and Čačak Angel Warriors defeated Niš Imperatori, by a large margin 42:6.

Serbian First League 

Every team from Serbia plays every one or two weeks.
Teams are divided into two divisions - A and B. Both divisions have three teams.

Division A: Wild Boars Kragujevac, Blue Dragons Belgrade, Jagodina Black Hornets.
Division B: Vukovi Belgrade, Wild Dogs Novi Sad, Inđija Indians.

System 

In the regular season each team plays home and away game within the division (4 games), and one game against teams from the other division (3 games). Top two teams from each division advance to the playoff semifinals. Third-placed teams play in the play-out game. Loser of the play-out game plays against the winner of Serbian Second League for the spot in the Serbian First League 2020.

In the playoff semifinals division winners play against second-placed teams from the other division (A1 vs B2; B1 vs A2). Winners advance to the Serbian Bowl.

Season 

Wild Boars went undefeated (7-0) in the regular season and won division A. Blue Dragons (3-4) finished second and Black Hornets (1-6) finished third in division A.

Vukovi Belgrade won division B (6-1), Wild Dogs finished second (4-3). Due to the organisational and financial problems Inđija Indians (0-7) withdrew from the competition. Therefore, play-out matches were canceled and the winner of Serbian Second League Banat Bulls qualified to play in the Serbian First League 2020.

In the semifinals Wild Boars defeated Wild Dogs 35:12. In the Belgrade Derby Vukovi defeated Blue Dragons 44:21.

In the Serbian Bowl XV Wild Boars defeated Vukovi 60:55 and won their ninth title.

Serbian Pro Bowl

System 

Serbian Probowl was introduced in 2008 Season.

It host best players from North and South divisions. These two teams play each other in the Probowl game.

History

Serbian Bowls

References

Notes

External links 
 Serbian National League official website

American football in Serbia
American football leagues in Europe
2003 establishments in Serbia and Montenegro
Sports leagues established in 2003